John Chidi Uzodinma (born 11 April 1994) is a Nigerian professional footballer who plays as a forward.

Career

Early career 
Born in Abuja, Nigeria, he started playing football from his childhood days. He started his career by playing in local clubs of Nigeria.

Club career 
He played for various South African football clubs. In 2019–20 season he signed for I-League side Mohammedan SC. He spent two successful seasons scoring 6 goals in 12 appearances. He signed for the I-League side NEROCA FC in 2022–23 season. He scored a goal at the Imphal Derby for NEROCA FC.

References 

Living people
Nigerian footballers
I-League 2nd Division players
I-League players
Mohammedan SC (Kolkata) players
NEROCA FC players
Association football forwards
1994 births